Eugene White Nixon (January 6, 1885 – March 5, 1969) was an American football coach and college athletics administrator. He served as the head football coach at Pomona College in Claremont, California from 1916 to 1934, compiling a record of 70–52–7. Nixon was also the athletic director at Pomona from 1924 until his retirement in 1951.

A native of Sparta, Illinois, Nixon attended Monmouth College in Monmouth, Illinois, where he starred in athletics. He played on Monmouth's football teams that won championships of three states in 1905 and 1906. He also lettered in basketball, played as a center fielder in baseball, and set a school record for the high jump in track. OUtside of sports, Nixon was the student body president at Monmouth and a fraternity leader. Nixon coached football and track at Davenport High School in Davenport, Iowa from 1909 until resigning in 1916 to move to Pomona.

In 1938, Nixon won the Republican Party nomination to represent California's 12th congressional district in the United States House of Representatives, but lost in the general election to incumbent Jerry Voorhis. Nixon died on March 5, 1969, at Pomona Valley Hospital in Pomona, California.

Head coaching record

College football

References

External links
 

1885 births
1969 deaths
American male high jumpers
Baseball outfielders
Caltech Beavers football coaches
Monmouth Fighting Scots baseball players
Monmouth Fighting Scots football players
Monmouth Fighting Scots men's basketball players
Pomona-Pitzer Sagehens football coaches
High school football coaches in Iowa
High school track and field coaches in the United States
People from Sparta, Illinois
People from St. Clair County, Illinois
California Republicans
Coaches of American football from Illinois
Players of American football from Illinois
Baseball players from Illinois
Basketball players from Illinois
Track and field athletes from Illinois